1951–52 was the sixth season of the Western International Hockey League.

Standings

 Spokane Flyers	        37-24-6	.597
 Trail Smoke Eaters	24-21-2	.532
 Nelson Maple Leafs	21-24-2	.468
 Kimberley Dynamiters	13-27-3	.337

Played interlocking with Pacific Coast Senior League & Okanagan Senior League.

League Championship final

Best of 5

 'Trail 8 Spokane 3
 Spokane 7 Trail 3
 Trail 6 Spokane 3
 Spokane 5 Trail 2
 Trail 5 Spokane 3

Trail Smoke Eaters beat Spokane Flyers 3 wins to 2.

Note: Spokane Flyers were not eligible for the Allan Cup.

Semi final

Best of 5

 Nelson 6 Kimberley 2
 Kimberley 6 Nelson 5
 Nelson 2 Kimberley 1
 Nelson 6 Kimberley 4

Nelson Maple Leafs beat Kimberley Dynamiters 3 wins to 1.

Final

Best of 5

 Trail 4 Nelson 3
 Nelson 9 Trail 3
 Trail 9 Nelson 1
 Nelson 4 Trail 3
 Trail 10 Nelson 2

Trail Smoke Eaters beat Nelson Maple Leafs 3 wins to 2.

Trail Smoke Eaters advanced to the 1951-52 British Columbia Senior Playoffs.

References 

The Spokesman-Review - Oct 13, 1951

Western International Hockey League seasons
Wihl Season, 1951–52
Wihl Season, 1951–52